Tatoi Airport  is an airport located north of Athens, in Decelea.  It started operating in 1918 and it now has a single runway with a length of 1764m (not counting the 347m threshold).  The airport is used by the Hellenic Air Force and is the base of the following aeroclubs:
 Athens Gliding Club 
 Dekeleia Aeroclub
 Athens Aeroclub
 Mesogeion Aeroclub

It has also been used by many other aeroclubs of Attica. Moreover, the Hellenic Air Force Museum is situated at the airport which contains many old aircraft.

Former Airlines and Destinations

Accidents and incidents
On 27 December 1991, Hellenic Air Force Douglas C-47B KK171 was damaged beyond repair in an accident at Tatoi Air Base. One of the six crew members was killed.

References

External links

LGTT World Aero Data:LGTT
Dekeleia Aeroclub website
Mesogeion Aeroclub website
Athens Aeroclub website
Airliners.gr Tatoi

Airports in Greece
Hellenic Air Force bases
Transport infrastructure in Attica